This is a list of solar farms in Queensland. There has been significant growth in this area recently, with an estimated 17298 MW of solar capacity either operational, planned or under construction.

Table 

Summary of capacity

References 

solar
Q
Solar
Solar power stations in Queensland